The Selborne Group is a geologic group in England. It preserves fossils dating back to the Cretaceous period. It comprises the Gault Formation (informally/traditionally the Gault Clay or Blue Marl) and the overlying Upper Greensand Formation (earlier known as the Malm or Malm Rock).

See also

 List of fossiliferous stratigraphic units in England

References

 

Cretaceous England